(H)Ashtrakhanids may refer to the following dynasties in Central Asia :

 the Khans of the Astrakhan Khanate
 their branch ruling the Khanate of Bukhara